This is a list of Jamaican women writers, including women writers either from or associated with Jamaica.

A
 Opal Palmer Adisa (born 1954)

B
 Amy Bailey (1895–1990)
 Gwyneth Barber Wood (died 2006)
 Mary Anne Barker (1831–1911)
 Vera Bell (1906–?)
 Louise Bennett-Coverley (1919–2006)
 Jacqueline Bishop (living)
 Emily Rose Bleby (1849–1917)
 Eliot Bliss (1903–1990)
 Cedella Booker (1926–2008) 
 Jean "Binta" Breeze (1956–2021)
 Yvonne Brewster (born 1938)
 Erna Brodber (born 1940)

C
 Hazel Campbell (1940–2018)
 Lady Colin Campbell (born 1949)
 Margaret Cezair-Thompson (living)
 Michelle Cliff (1946–2016) 
 Carolyn Cooper (born 1950)
 Christine Craig (born 1943)

D
 Jean D'Costa (born 1937)
 Nicole Dennis-Benn (born 1982)

E
 Beverley East (born 1953)

F
 Honor Ford-Smith (born 1951)

G
 Amy Jacques Garvey (1895–1973)
 Delores Gauntlett (born 1949)
 Lorna Goodison (born 1947)

H
 Nalo Hopkinson (born 1960)

L
 Andrea Levy (1956–2019)
 Olive Lewin (1927–2013) 
 Heather Little-White (1952–2013)

M
 Alecia McKenzie (living)
 Kellie Magnus (born 1970)
 Rachel Manley (living)
 Una Marson (1905–1965)
 Kara Miller (living)
 Pamela Mordecai (born 1942)

P
 Kayla Perrin (born 1970?)
 Velma Pollard (born 1937)
 Patricia Powell (born 1966)
 Helen Pyne-Timothy (1937–2015)

Q
 Ada Quayle (1920–2002)

R
 Claudia Rankine (born 1963)
 Joan Riley (born 1958)
 Kim Robinson-Walcott (born 1956)

S
 Mary Seacole (1805–1881)
 Olive Senior (born 1941)
 Verene Shepherd (born 1951)
 Tanya Shirley (born 1976)
 Makeda Silvera (born 1955)
 Vanessa Spence (born 1961)

T
 Elean Thomas (1947–2004)

W
 Sylvia Wynter (born 1928)

Z
 Fiona Zedde (born 1976)

See also
 List of women writers

Jamaican writers
Jamaican women writers, List of
Lists of Jamaican women
writers